"A far l'amore comincia tu" ("Start making love first") is a song by Italian singer Raffaella Carrà from her album Forte forte forte (1976). It was written by Franco Bracardi and Daniele Pace, and produced by Gianni Boncompagni.

The song became a big national and international hit, being translated into several languages including Spanish, German, French and English.

Other versions and covers 
 "A far l'amore comincia tu" was recorded by Carrà in Spanish as "En el amor todo es empezar", in German as "Liebelei", in French as "Puisque tu l'aimes dis-le lui", and in English as "Do It, Do It Again". The latter was Carrà's only entry on the UK Singles Chart, reaching number 9.

 In 1977, German singer Tony Holiday covered the song, retitled "Tanze Samba mit mir". The song quickly became a hit in both Germany and Austria, peaking at no. 4 on the German music charts and reaching the Top 20 on the Austrian music charts.

 "A far l'amore comincia tu" has also been covered in Turkish by Turkish popstar Ajda Pekkan as "Sakın Ha" in 1977. In 2002, Nez covered also same song.

 In 1977, Carlie Bergmann covered the song in English, the name being changed to "Feed the Fire", as the B-side to "I've Been Watchin' You".

 In 1978, another Turkish singer, Ayla Algan, covered the song as "Bilenler Kazanıyor" with different lyrics from "Sakın Ha" performed by Ajda Pekkan.

 In 1978, Canadian singer Châtelaine covered the song in French, retitled "Corps à corps", on her eponymous album Châtelaine.

 In 1982, Brasilian singer Sidney Magal covered the song in Portuguese, retitled "Alegria De Viver", on his album Magal Espetacular.

 Dutch girl group Luv' recorded the song in English as "Don Juanito de carnaval" in 1978 that appeared on the With Luv' album.

 In 1995, Serbian singer Sanja Đorđević covered the song in Serbian, retitled "Dosta je igre te", on her album Zorane.

 In 2008, a video of a performance of "Do It, Do It Again" appeared in the Doctor Who episode "Midnight".

 In 2011, French DJ Bob Sinclar sampled the original Italian version of "A far l'amore comincia tu" and included it in his single "Far l'amore".

 In 2020, Canarian singer Ana Guerra recorded a version of "En El Amor Todo Es Empezar", which is part of the soundtrack of the movie "Explota Explota" (a Spanish-language musical comedy based on the songs of Raffaella Carrá).

 In 2022, Italian singer Tananai released a rearrangement of the song together with rapper Rosa Chemical called ″COMINCIA TU″.

Track listings 
7" single "Forte forte forte" (Italy, 1976)
 A. "Forte forte forte"
 (Malgioglio – Bracardi)
 B. "A far l'amore comincia tu"
 (Daniele Pace – Bracardi)
 CGD 4236
 CBS Sugar S.p.A.

7" single (Canada, 1976)
 A. "A far l'amore comincia tu (2:42)
 B. "Forte forte forte (3:32)
Columbia C4 8148
Manufactured by CBS Disques Canada Ltée

7" single "Raffaella Carrà canta en español "Fuerte fuerte fuerte" (Spain, 1976)
A. "Fuerte fuerte fuerte" ("Forte forte forte") (2:40) [in Spanish]
B. "En el amor todo es empezar" ("A far l'amore comincia tu") (3:40) [in Spanish]
CBS 4670
Discos CBS, S.A., Madrid

7" single "Liebelei" (Germany, 1977)
A. "Liebelei" (2:40)
B. "Forte forte forte" (3:40) [in German]
CBS S 5543

7" single "Do It, Do It Again" (Germany, 1978)
A. "Do It, Do It Again" (2:40) (englische Originalaufnahme von "Liebelei (A far l'amore comincia tu)" [in English]
B. "A far l'amore comincia tu" (2:40)
CBS 6094, CBS S 6094
CBS Schallplatten GmbH

7" single "Puisque tu l'aimes dis-le lui / A far l'amore comincia tu" (France, 1978)
A. "Puisque tu l'aimes dis-le lui" (2:40) (Vers. "A far l'amore comincia tu") [in French]
B. "A far l'amore comincia tu" (2:40)
CBS 4771
CBS Inc.

7" single "A far l'amore comincia tu (Liebelei)" (Germany)
7" single "A far l'amore comincia tu (Liebelei) / Puisque tu l'aimes dis-le lui" (Netherlands)
 A. "A far l'amore comincia tu (Liebelei)" (2:40)
 B. "Puisque tu l'aimes dis-le lui" 2:40 [in French]
CBS 4771, CBS S 4771

Charts

References 

1976 songs
1976 singles
Raffaella Carrà songs
Songs written by Daniele Pace

Columbia Records singles
Compagnia Generale del Disco singles